Hwayang-myeon, also called as Hwayang Township, or shortly Hwayang, is a myeon (township) in Yeosu city of South Jeolla Province, South Korea. The myeon is located in south-western part of the city. The total area of the myeon is 70.1 square kilometres, and, as of the last day of 2010, the population was 8108 people, 3559 houses. The township hall is located in Najin-ri, and address of the township hall is 16-10, Najin-gil, Hwayang-myeon. Hwajeong-myeon and Jangsu Bay is southern section, Sora-myeon is northern section, Ssangbong-dong is north-eastern section, the Gamak Bay is eastern section, and the Yeoja Bay is western section.

History 
 1897: Hwayang-myeon, Yeosu-gun, Jeollanam-do
 1910: Township hall was opened.
 15 August 1949: Hwayang-myeon, Yeocheon-gun, Jeollanam-do: Yeosu-gun was split into Yeosu-si and Yeocheon-gun.
 1 April 1998: Hwayang-myeon, Yeosu-si, Jeollanam-do: Yeosu-si, Yeocheon-si, and Yeocheon-gun were merged to Yeosu-si.

Ri 
It has ten jurisdictions and thirty one administrative districts.

Najin-ri 
Najin-ri ( has two administrative districts: Najin(나진), Sojang(소장). It has Hwayang township hall.

Seochon-ri 
Seochon-ri ( has three administrative districts: Seochon(서촌), Seokgyo(석교), Bongo(봉오).

Anpo-ri 
Anpo-ri ( has three administrative districts: Sepo(세포), Wonpo(원포), Anpo(안포). It has Baegyadaegyo on Baegya-ro on the National Route 77 and Jibangdo 863 with Baegyado in Baegya-ri, Hwajeong-myeon.

Okjeok-ri 
Okjeok-ri ( has four administrative districts: Masang(마상), Okjeok(옥적), Daeok(대옥), Sangjeon(상전).

Yongju-ri 
Yongju-ri ( has four administrative districts: Yongju(용주), Gonae(고내), Hodu(호두), Hwaryeon(화련).

Imok-ri 
Imok-ri ( has four administrative districts: Imok(이목), Seoyeon(서연), Gumi(구미), Beolga(벌가).

Icheon-ri 
Icheon-ri ( has three administrative districts: Ocheon(오천), Icheon(이천), Gamdo(감도).

Jangsu-ri 
Jangsu-ri ( has four administrative districts: Jangsu(장수), Sumun(수문), Jangcheok(장척), Jangdeung(장등). Jangsu Bay was named after this ri. It will have Hwayangdaegyo on the National Route 77 with Jobaldo in Jobal-ri, Hwajeong-myeon.

Changmu-ri 
Changmu-ri ( has two administrative districts: Changmu(창무), Baekcho(백초).

Hwadong-ri 
Hwadong-ri ( has two administrative districts: Hwadong(화동), Cheongyang(청양).

Transport 
It doesn't have any railways, expressways nor the motorways. It has National Route 77, Gukjido 22 and Jibangdo 863. It has a bridge named Baegyadaegyo on the National Route 77 and the Jibangdo 863. Baegyadaegyo connect Anpo-ri and Baegyado in Baegya-ri, Hwajeong-myeon. It will have Hwayangdaegyo on the National Route 77 connecting Jangsu-ri and Jobaldo in Jobal-ri, Hwajeong-myeon.

Islands 
The population of all of these islands below are the zero. (They are no-personed islands.)

References

External links 
 여수시 화양면사무소

Yeosu
Towns and townships in South Jeolla Province